Hügelland/Täler is a Verwaltungsgemeinschaft ("collective municipality") in the district Saale-Holzland, in Thuringia, Germany. The seat of the Verwaltungsgemeinschaft is in Tröbnitz.

The Verwaltungsgemeinschaft Hügelland/Täler consists of the following municipalities:

References

Verwaltungsgemeinschaften in Thuringia